Shevgaon is a city in Shevgaon tehsil of Ahmednagar in the Indian state of Maharashtra

 

Many villages of this tehsil were submerged by the floodwater of the Jayakwadi Dam in the 1970s. Shevgaon used to be known as Shivgram, because there were five Shiva Mandirs around the city.

Demographics 
According to the 2011 Indian census, Shevgaon has a population of 38,375, including 19,442 males and 18,993 females. There are 8,013 families, and 12.7% of the village population is children.

Shevgaon village has a slightly higher literacy rate than Maharashtra as a whole, at 82.43% literate.

References

Cities and towns in Ahmednagar district